Eneriko Seruma is the pen name for Ugandan poet, novelist and short story writer Henry S. Kimbugwe (born 1944). He is the author of the novel The Experience and a collection of short stories titled The Heart Seller. He also wrote poems and short stories for leading East African journals and magazines in the 1960s and 1970s, including for Ghala, Busara, Zuka and Transition.'

Early life and education
Seruma was born in Uganda and educated in the United States. He attended St. Mary's College Kisubi for his secondary education. He attended, and graduated from, Marlboro College in Marlboro, Vermont. He was the public relations officer for the East African Publishing House and was an award winner of the East Africa Literature Bureau's and Deutsche Welle's creative writing competitions.

Published works

Novels

Short story collections

Anthologies
 "The Town", in

References 

Living people
1944 births
20th-century Ugandan poets
Ugandan writers
Ugandan novelists
Male novelists
Ugandan male short story writers
Ugandan short story writers
Ugandan male poets
20th-century short story writers
20th-century male writers